A chemical equation is the symbolic representation of a chemical reaction in the form of symbols and chemical formulas. The reactant entities are given on the left-hand side and the product entities are on the right-hand side with a plus sign between the entities in both the reactants and the products, and an arrow that points towards the products to show the direction of the reaction. The chemical formulas may be symbolic, structural (pictorial diagrams), or intermixed. The coefficients next to the symbols and formulas of entities are the absolute values of the stoichiometric numbers. The first chemical equation was diagrammed by Jean Beguin in 1615.

Structure 

A chemical equation (see an example below) consists of a list of reactants (the starting substances) on the left-hand side, an arrow symbol, and a list of products (substances formed in the chemical reaction) on the right-hand side. Each substance is specified by its chemical formula, optionally preceded by a number called stoichiometric coefficient. The coefficient specifies how many entities (e.g. molecules) of that substance are involved in the reaction on a molecular basis. If not written explicitly, the coefficient is equal to 1. Multiple substances on any side of the equation are separated from each other by a plus sign.

As an example, the equation for the reaction of hydrochloric acid with sodium can be denoted:

2HCl + 2Na -> 2NaCl + H2

Given the formulas are fairly simple, this equation could be read as "two H-C-L plus two N-A yields two N-A-C-L and H two." Alternately, and in general for equations involving complex chemicals, the chemical formulas are read using IUPAC nomenclature, which could verbalise this equation as "two hydrochloric acid molecules and two sodium atoms react to form two formula units of sodium chloride and a hydrogen gas molecule."

Reaction types 
Different variants of the arrow symbol are used to denote the type of a reaction:

{|
| style="text-align: center; padding-right: 0.5em;" | -> || net forward reaction
|-
| style="text-align: center; padding-right: 0.5em;" |   || reaction in both directions
|-
| style="text-align: center; padding-right: 0.5em;" | <=> || equilibrium
|-
| style="text-align: center; padding-right: 0.5em;" | = || stoichiometric relation
|-
| style="text-align: center; padding-right: 0.5em;" | <-> || resonance (not a reaction)
|}

State of matter 
To indicate physical state of a chemical, a symbol in parentheses may be appended to its formula: (s) for a solid, (l) for a liquid, (g) for a gas, and (aq) for an aqueous solution. This is especially done when one wishes to emphasize the states or changes thereof. For example, the reaction of aqueous hydrochloric acid with solid (metallic) sodium to form aqueous sodium chloride and hydrogen gas would be written like this:

2HCl(aq) + 2Na(s) -> 2NaCl(aq) + H2(g) 

That reaction would have different thermodynamic and kinetic properties if gaseous hydrogen chloride were to replace the hydrochloric acid as a reactant:

2HCl(g) + 2Na(s) -> 2NaCl(s) + H2(g)

Alternately, an arrow without parentheses is used in some cases to indicate formation of a gas ↑ or precipitate ↓. This is especially useful if only one such species is formed. Here is an example indicating that hydrogen gas is formed:

2HCl + 2Na -> 2 NaCl + H2 ^

Catalysis and other conditions 

If the reaction requires energy, it is indicated above the arrow. A capital Greek letter delta (Δ) or a triangle (△) is put on the reaction arrow to show that energy in the form of heat is added to the reaction. The expression  is used as a symbol for the addition of energy in the form of light. Other symbols are used for other specific types of energy or radiation. 

Similarly, if a reaction requires a certain medium with certain specific characteristics, then the name of the acid or base that is used as a medium may be placed on top of the arrow. If no specific acid or base is required, another way of denoting the use of an acidic or basic medium is to write H+ or OH− (or even "acid" or "base") on top of the arrow. Specific conditions of the temperature and pressure, as well as the presence of catalysts, may be indicated in the same way.

Notation variants 

The standard notation for chemical equations only permits all reactants on one side, all products on the other, and all stoichiometric coefficients positive. For example, the usual form of the equation for dehydration of methanol to dimethylether is:

 2 CH3OH -> CH3OCH3 + H2O

Sometimes an extension is used, where some substances with their stoichiometric coefficients are moved above or below the arrow, preceded by a plus sign or nothing for a reactant, and by a minus sign for a product. Then the same equation can look like this:

 2 CH3OH ->[\overset{}\ce{-H2O}] CH3OCH3

Such notation serves to hide less important substances from the sides of the equation, to make the type of reaction at hand more obvious, and to facilitate chaining of chemical equations. This is very useful in illustrating multi-step reaction mechanisms. Note that the substances above or below the arrows are not catalysts in this case, because they are consumed or produced in the reaction like ordinary reactants or products.

Another extension used in reaction mechanisms moves some substances to branches of the arrow. Both extensions are used in the example illustration of a mechanism.

Use of negative stoichiometric coefficients at either side of the equation (like in the example below) is not widely adopted and is often discouraged.

 2 CH3OH \;-\; H2O -> CH3OCH3

Balancing chemical equations 

Because no nuclear reactions take place in a chemical reaction, the chemical elements pass through the reaction unchanged. Thus, each side of the chemical equation must represent the same number of atoms of any particular element (or nuclide, if different isotopes are taken into account). The same holds for the total electric charge, as stated by the charge conservation law. An equation adhering to these requirements is said to be balanced.

A chemical equation is balanced by assigning suitable values to the stoichiometric coefficients. Simple equations can be balanced by inspection, that is, by trial and error. Another technique involves solving a system of linear equations.

Balanced equations are usually written with smallest natural-number coefficients. Yet sometimes it may be advantageous to accept a fractional coefficient, if it simplifies the other coefficients. The introductory example can thus be rewritten as
HCl + Na -> NaCl + 1/2 H2

In some circumstances the fractional coefficients are even inevitable. For example, the reaction corresponding to the standard enthalpy of formation must be written such that one molecule of a single product is formed. This will often require that some reactant coefficients be fractional, as is the case with the formation of lithium fluoride:

Li(s) + 1/2F2(g) -> LiF(s)

Inspection method 

The method of inspection can be outlined as setting the most complex substance's stoichiometric coefficient to 1 and assigning values to other coefficients step by step such that both sides of the equation end up with the same number of atoms for each element. If any fractional coefficients arise during this process, the presence of fractions may be eliminated (at any time) by multiplying all coefficients by their lowest common denominator.

 Example
Balancing of the chemical equation for the complete combustion of methane
\mathord{?}\,{CH4} + \mathord{?}\,{O2} -> \mathord{?}\,{CO2} + \mathord{?}\,{H2O}
is achieved as follows:

 A coefficient of 1 is placed in front of the most complex formula (CH4):
1 {CH4} + \mathord{?}\,{O2} -> \mathord{?}\,{CO2} + \mathord{?}\,{H2O}
 The left-hand side has 1 carbon atom, so 1 molecule of CO2 will balance it. The left-hand side also has 4 hydrogen atoms, which will be balanced by 2 molecules of H2O:
1 {CH4} + \mathord{?}\,{O2} -> 1 {CO2} + 2 H2O
 Balancing the 4 oxygen atoms of the right-hand side by 2 molecules of O2 yields the equation
1 CH4 + 2 O2 -> 1 CO2 + 2 H2O
 The coefficients equal to 1 are omitted, as they do not need to be specified explicitly:
CH4 + 2 O2 -> CO2 + 2 H2O
 It is wise to check that the final equation is balanced, i.e. that for each element there is the same number of atoms on the left- and right-hand side: 1 carbon, 4 hydrogen, and 4 oxygen.

System of linear equations 
For each chemical element (or nuclide or unchanged moiety or charge) , its conservation requirement can be expressed by the mathematical equation

where
 is the number of atoms of element  in a molecule of substance  (per formula in the chemical equation), and
 is the stoichiometric coefficient for the substance .

This results in a homogeneous system of linear equations, which are readily solved using mathematical methods. Such system always has the all-zeros trivial solution, which we are not interested in, but if there are any additional solutions, there will be infinite number of them. Any non-trivial solution will balance the chemical equation. A "preferred" solution is one with whole-number, mostly positive stoichiometric coefficients  with greatest common divisor equal to one.

Example 
Let us assign variables to stoichiometric coefficients of the chemical equation from the previous section and write the corresponding linear equations:

\mathit{s}_1 {CH4} + \mathit{s}_2 {O2} -> \mathit{s}_3 {CO2} + \mathit{s}_4 {H2O}

All solutions to this system of linear equations are of the following form, where  is any real number:

The choice of  yields the preferred solution,

which corresponds to the balanced chemical equation:

CH4 + 2 O2 -> CO2 + 2 H2O

Matrix method 
The system of linear equations introduced in the previous section can also be written using an efficient matrix formalism. First, to unify the reactant and product stoichiometric coefficients , let us introduce the quantity

called stoichiometric number, which simplifies the linear equations to

where  is the total number of reactant and product substances (formulas) in the chemical equation.

Placement of the values  at row  and column  of the composition matrix

and arrangement of the stoichiometric numbers into the stoichiometric vector

allows the system of equations to be expressed as a single matrix equation:

Like previously, any nonzero stoichiometric vector , which solves the matrix equation, will balance the chemical equation.

The set of solutions to the matrix equation is a linear space called the kernel of the matrix . For this space to contain nonzero vectors , i.e. to have a positive dimension N, the columns of the composition matrix  must not be linearly independent. The problem of balancing a chemical equation then becomes the problem of determining the N-dimensional kernel of the composition matrix. It is important to note that only for N = 1 will there be a unique preferred solution to the balancing problem. For N > 1 there will be an infinite number of preferred solutions with N of them linearly independent. If N = 0, there will be only the unusable trivial solution, the zero vector.

 Example
Let us take the same chemical equation again and write the corresponding matrix equation:

\mathit{s}_1 {CH4} + \mathit{s}_2 {O2} -> \mathit{s}_3 {CO2} + \mathit{s}_4 {H2O}

Its solutions are of the following form, where  is any real number:

Ionic equations

An ionic equation is a chemical equation in which electrolytes are written as dissociated ions. Ionic equations are used for single and double displacement reactions that occur in aqueous solutions.

For example, in the following precipitation reaction:
CaCl2 + 2AgNO3 -> Ca(NO3)2 + 2 AgCl(v)
the full ionic equation is:
Ca^2+ + 2Cl^- + 2Ag+ + 2NO3^- -> Ca^2+ + 2NO3^- + 2AgCl(v)
or, with all physical states included:
Ca^2+(aq) + 2Cl^{-}(aq) + 2Ag+(aq) + 2NO3^{-}(aq) -> Ca^2+(aq) + 2NO3^{-}(aq) + 2AgCl(v)

In this reaction, the Ca2+ and the NO3− ions remain in solution and are not part of the reaction. That is, these ions are identical on both the reactant and product side of the chemical equation. Because such ions do not participate in the reaction, they are called spectator ions. A net ionic equation is the full ionic equation from which the spectator ions have been removed. The net ionic equation of the proceeding reactions is:
2Cl^- + 2Ag+ -> 2AgCl(v)

or, in reduced balanced form,
Ag+ + Cl^- -> AgCl(v)

In a neutralization or acid/base reaction, the net ionic equation will usually be:
H+ (aq) + OH^{-}(aq) -> H2O(l)

There are a few acid/base reactions that produce a precipitate in addition to the water molecule shown above. An example is the reaction of barium hydroxide with phosphoric acid, which produces not only water but also the insoluble salt barium phosphate. In this reaction, there are no spectator ions, so the net ionic equation is the same as the full ionic equation.

3Ba(OH)2 + 2H3PO4 -> 6H2O + Ba3(PO4)2(v)

Double  displacement reactions that feature a carbonate reacting with an acid have the net ionic equation:

If every ion is a "spectator ion" then there was no reaction, and the net ionic equation is null.

Generally, if zj is the multiple of elementary charge on the j-th molecule, charge neutrality may be written as:

where the νj are the stoichiometric coefficients described above. The zj may be incorporated
as an additional row in the aij matrix described above, and a properly balanced ionic equation will then also obey:

History

Typesetting

Notes

References

Stoichiometry
Equations
Chemistry